The Concerto for Clarinet and Orchestra is a clarinet concerto in three movements by the American composer John Corigliano.  The work was commissioned by the New York Philharmonic for the clarinetist Stanley Drucker.  It was composed in the summer and fall of 1977 and was first performed in New York City on December 6, 1977, by Drucker and the New York Philharmonic conducted by Leonard Bernstein.  The composition is dedicated to Drucker and Bernstein.

Composition

Background
Corigliano described the inspiration for the Clarinet Concerto in the score program notes, writing:
He continued:
Corigliano later recalled, "When I showed Stanley the first movement of the concerto, it was the only time I've ever seen him in his life look terrified. But I showed him his part, and his eyes got very big. And he said, 'How am I gonna play this?' And then he started playing it and, of course, in no time at all, he found that he could not only play it, but that it sounded like a million dollars when he did."

Structure
The piece has a duration of roughly 30 minutes and is composed in three movements:
Cadenzas
Elegy
Antiphonal Toccata

The first movement "Cadenzas" consists of two cadenzas separated by an interlude, subtitled "Ignis fatuus" ("Will-o'-the-wisp") and "Corona solis" ("the crown of the sun").  The second movement "Elegy" was composed in memory Corigliano's father John Corigliano Sr., a former concertmaster of the New York Philharmonic who died in 1975.  The third movement "Antiphonal Toccata" was composed as Corigliano's "solution to the balance problems created by using the full orchestra in a wind concerto;" this movement features a number of antiphonal performers and quotes the Italian composer Giovanni Gabrieli's 1597 composition Sonata pian' e forte.

Instrumentation
The work is scored for solo clarinet and an orchestra comprising three flutes, piccolo, three oboes, cor anglais, two additional clarinets, bass clarinet, three bassoons, contrabassoon, six French horns, four trumpets, three trombones, tuba, timpani, three percussionists, harp, piano, and strings.

Reception
Jeff Lunden of NPR called the clarinet concerto "a fiendishly difficult work."  A. Ashby of Gramophone described the piece as "full to bursting with antiphony and visual spectacle" and specifically lauded the third movement, saying it "has a poise and sense of shape that fairly take the breath away."  The music critic Peter Dickinson said it "impressed a wide audience" and similarly wrote of the final movement, "The finale ('Antiphonal Toccata') is consistently energetic, with a spectacular passage for timpani and a spacious chorale that unifies the movement."

See also
List of compositions by John Corigliano

References

Concertos by John Corigliano
1977 compositions
Corigliano, John
Music commissioned by the New York Philharmonic